Age Isn't Everything (also known as Life in the Food Chain) is a 1991 comedy film directed by Douglas Katz and starring Jonathan Silverman, Robert Prosky, and Rita Moreno. The film premiered at the 1991 American Film Market, and was consecutively released on video by Live Home Video.

Premise
21-year-old Seymour (Silverman) dreams of becoming an astronaut, but is pressured by his parents (Moreno & Sorvino) to go to Harvard law school and then go into business. After graduating, Seymour lets go of his dreams and becomes a business man. One day, he wakes up and suddenly feels and acts like an 83-year-old man. He is fired from his job for being "too old" and doctors can't explain the situation.

Cast 
Jonathan Silverman as Seymour
Robert Prosky as Grandpa Irving
Rita Moreno as Rita
Paul Sorvino as Max
Robert Cicchini as Bruno
Brian Williams as Gerrard
Bella Abzug as herself
Joyce Brothers as herself

Production
The film was shot between October 8 and November 3, 1990.

References

External links 
 

1991 films
American comedy films
1990s English-language films
Films set in New York City
1991 comedy films
1990s American films